Juvenal Junior Mel Agnero (born 29 December 1998) is an Ivorian footballer who plays as a forward.

Career statistics

Club

Notes

References

1998 births
Living people
Ivorian footballers
Ivory Coast under-20 international footballers
Italian footballers
Ivorian expatriate footballers
Association football forwards
Serie D players
Moldovan Super Liga players
A.C. Milan players
FC Sfîntul Gheorghe players
Ivorian expatriate sportspeople in Moldova
Italian expatriate sportspeople in Moldova
Expatriate footballers in Moldova
Ivorian expatriate sportspeople in Switzerland
Italian expatriate sportspeople in Switzerland
Expatriate footballers in Switzerland